Zec Petite-Rivière-Cascapédia is a "zone d'exploitation contrôlée" (controlled harvesting zone) (ZEC) in the unorganized territory of Rivière-Bonaventure, in Bonaventure Regional County Municipality, in the administrative region Gaspésie-Îles-de-la-Madeleine, in Quebec, in Canada. The main purpose of the ZEC is managing salmon fishing.

Geography 

Zec Petite-Rivière-Cascapédia covers the journey of the "Petite-rivière Cascapedia" in Gaspésie.

Salmon fishing 
It includes four fishing sectors in the area of the ZEC. Four species are fished: salmon, trout, brook trout (sea trout) and sculpin. Recreative fishing is practiced by wading or by boat, according to the convenience and periods of flooding. Nature adepts can participate in recreative fishing with or without guide. Initially, the daily salmon fishing rights per fishing sectors are awarded randomly per pole and vault pit. Then the remaining rights are assigned with or without reservation.

ZEC offers accommodation in chalets at Mélançon camp, located on Lake Mélançon near the Petite Rivière-Cascapedia. Visitors of the ZEC may also use the services of the campground. In addition, visitors can venture into hiking and mountain biking in the region; they discover unique landscapes in this mountainous area.

Toponymy 

According to the Commission de toponymie du Québec (Geographical Names Board of Quebec), the term "Cascapedia" appears in 26 names on the territory of the Quebec. The largest number of these names are found in the Gaspé Peninsula.

The name "Zec Petite-Rivière-Cascapédia" was formalized on March 5, 1993, at the Bank of place names in the Commission de toponymie du Québec (Geographical Names Board of Quebec).

See also 
 Chaleur Bay (Baie des Chaleurs)
 Gaspésie
 Gaspésie National Park
 Rivière-Bonaventure, unorganized territory
 Bonaventure River, coastal river flowing into the Chaleur Bay (Baie-des-Chaleurs)
 Cascapedia-Saint-Jules, municipality of Gaspésie
 Grande-Cascapédia, a town of Gaspésie
 Zone d'exploitation contrôlée (Controlled harvesting zone) (ZEC)

References 

Protected areas of Gaspésie–Îles-de-la-Madeleine
Protected areas established in 1992